Jordan-Carmichael Subban (born March 3, 1995) is a Canadian professional ice hockey defenceman currently an unrestricted free agent. He most recently played for the  Hershey Bears of the American Hockey League (AHL). He was selected by the Vancouver Canucks in the fourth round (115th overall) of the 2013 NHL Entry Draft. He is the youngest of the three Subban brothers to be drafted into the NHL, the other two being Malcolm Subban and P. K. Subban.

Playing career

Subban was signed by the Canucks to a three-year entry-level contract on May 14, 2015. Following their training camp for the 2015–16 season, the Canucks assigned Subban to their American Hockey League affiliate, the Utica Comets, to begin his professional career. He spent the entire season with the Comets, tallying 11 goals and 25 assists in 67 games.

At the start of the 2016–17 season, Subban was again assigned to the Comets to start the season. On January 5, 2017, Subban was named an AHL All-Star, and on January 19, the Canucks recalled Subban for his first stint in the NHL, though he did not see any game action before being returned to the Comets. On December 7, 2017, Subban was traded to the Los Angeles Kings in exchange for Nic Dowd. 

After finishing the season with the Kings' AHL farm team, the Ontario Reign, Subban was not offered a contract by the Kings and was released as a free agent, whereupon he signed with the hometown Toronto Maple Leafs on a one-year, two-way contract on July 1, 2018.

Subban sat out the pandemic delayed and shortened  season as a free agent, returning to resume his professional by agreeing to a one-year AHL contract with the Hershey Bears, a primary affiliate to the Washington Capitals, on August 12, 2021.

Personal life
Subban's oldest brother, P. K. Subban, won the Norris Trophy in 2013 and played for the Montreal Canadiens, Nashville Predators, & New Jersey Devils. Another brother, Malcolm, is a goaltender for the Buffalo Sabres.

Career statistics

Regular season and playoffs

International

References

External links

1995 births
Living people
Belleville Bulls players
Black Canadian ice hockey players
Canadian ice hockey defencemen
Canadian ice hockey players
Canadian people of Jamaican descent
Canadian people of Montserratian descent
Dornbirn Bulldogs players
Hershey Bears players
Ontario Reign (AHL) players
South Carolina Stingrays players
Ice hockey people from Toronto
Toronto Marlboros players
Toronto Marlies players
Utica Comets players
Vancouver Canucks draft picks